Leonid Khankevich (born 21 August 1995) is a Belarusian footballer who plays for Kujawiak Kowal.

References

External links

1995 births
Living people
Belarusian footballers
Association football forwards
Belarusian expatriate footballers
Expatriate footballers in Poland
FC Torpedo-BelAZ Zhodino players
FC Smolevichi players
FC Luch Minsk (2012) players
FC Belshina Bobruisk players
FC Dnyapro Mogilev players
FC Gorodeya players
FC Smorgon players
FC Volna Pinsk players